Jurgen Pierre Katharina Verstrepen (born 12 June 1966) is a former radio and television presenter, a member of the municipal council of Antwerp and a member of the Flemish Parliament. He lives in Wilrijk.

Elected for Vlaams Belang, Verstrepen switched sides to List Dedecker in April 2007. He completed the term as a self-proclaimed independent. In 2009 he was re-elected, this time as a candidate for List Dedecker.

References

1966 births
Living people
Flemish politicians
Belgian bloggers
Members of the Flemish Parliament
Belgian radio presenters
Libertair, Direct, Democratisch politicians
Vlaams Belang politicians
21st-century Belgian politicians